Niger Potters is a Nigerian basketball team based in Minna. The team plays in the Nigerian Premier League. In 2007, the Potters finished fifth in the Africa Clubs Champions Cup.

In African competitions
FIBA Africa Clubs Champions Cup  (1 appearance)
2007 – 5th Place

References

Basketball teams in Nigeria